The Electric Alarm is a 1915 American short drama film directed by Tod Browning and starring A. E. Freeman and Charles Gorman.

Cast
 A. E. Freeman as Ryley
 Charles Gorman as Dick Ray
 Lucy Payton as Mary's mother
 Lilian Webster as Mary

References

External links

1915 films
1915 drama films
1915 short films
American silent short films
American black-and-white films
Silent American drama films
Films directed by Tod Browning
1910s American films